Jakkrit LG-Gym (born: March 24, 1974 in Kamphaeng Phet province, upper central Thailand) was a retired Thai professional boxer who fought in the Junior flyweight (108 lb) division in the mid-90s. He is currently a disabled person. His record to 6-0 (3KOs).

Biography
When Sairung Suwanasil lost the WBF Junior flyweight champion to Mexican-Chinese descent Jesús "El Tigre" Chong on July 16, 1995, in Ayutthaya province. Jakkrit was assigned to challenge the title comeback, even though he only fought four times.

He surprised the reporters at the press conference by appearing in school uniform. He is only a high school student and is only a no-name boxer.

The fight took place on October 21, 1995, in Nong Khai province. It appears that he has suffered throughout the 12 round. But he was the winner with the points decision eventual.

After two months, he fought in non-title fight against Filipino Benjamin Escobia, he won by the skin of his teeth. Later, while he was training he suddenly fell down. He was taken to the hospital. The doctor has examined and found that his brain has suffered a lot from the fight with Chong shortly before. After surgery when he revives he became a disability and to retire at the age of 21 years implicitly.

Today he lives with his parents at his native Kamphaeng Phet he has left paralysis and his eyes were closed. He was assisted by the Sports Authority of Thailand monthly payment of 5,000 baht.

References

External links
 

Living people
1974 births
Light-flyweight boxers
Jakkrit LG-Gym
Jakkrit LG-Gym